The 1956 British Columbia general election was the 25th general election in the Province of British Columbia, Canada. It was held to elect members of the Legislative Assembly of British Columbia. The election was called on August 13, 1956, and held on September 19, 1956.  The new legislature met for the first time on February 7, 1957.

The conservative Social Credit of Premier W.A.C. Bennett was re-elected with a majority in the legislature to a third term in government with over 45% of the popular vote.

The social democratic CCF formed the official opposition.

The British Columbia Liberal Party lost two of its four seats despite winning over 20% of the popular vote.

The Progressive Conservative Party lost its single seat in the legislature, and would not win a seat again until the 1972 election.

One seat was won by a Labour candidate, Tom Uphill of Fernie.

This election was first after BC switched from Alternative Voting (IRV) (in both single and multi-member districts) back to its historic system that used First Past The Post in single-member districts and Block Voting in multi-member districts.

Results

Note:

* Party did not nominate candidates in the previous election.

Results by riding

|-
||    
|align="center"|William James Asselstine
|align="center"  |Atlin<small>Social Credit
||    
||    
|align="center"  |Alberni<small>CCF
|align="center"|Stanley John Squire<small>
||    
|-
||    
|align="center"|William Ralph Talbot Chetwynd<small>
|align="center"  |Cariboo<small>Social Credit
||    
||    
|align="center" rowspan=2 |Burnaby<small>CCF
|align="center"|Gordon Dowding
||    
|-
||    
|align="center"|William Kenneth Kiernan<small>
|align="center"  |Chilliwack<small>Social Credit
||    
||    
|align="center"|Ernest Edward Winch
||    
|-
||    
|align="center"|Richard Orr Newton<small>
|align="center"  |Columbia<small>Social Credit
||    
||    
|align="center"  |Cowichan-Newcastle<small>CCF
|align="center"|Robert Martin Strachan2
||    
|-
||    
|align="center"|Daniel Robert John Campbell
|align="center"  |Comox<small>Social Credit
||    
||    
|align="center"  |Cranbrook<small>CCF
|align="center"|Leo Thomas Nimsick
||    
|-
||    
|align="center"|Thomas Irwin<small>
|align="center" rowspan=2 |Delta<small>Social Credit
||    
||    
|align="center"  |Grand Forks-Greenwood<small>CCF
|align="center"|Lois Haggen
||    
|-
||    
|align="center"|Nehemiah George Massey
||    
||    
|align="center"  |Kaslo-Slocan<small>CCF
|align="center"|Randolph Harding
||    
|-
||    
|align="center"|Lyle Wicks<small>
|align="center"  |Dewdney<small>Social Credit
||    
||    
|align="center"  |Mackenzie<small>CCF
|align="center"|Anthony John Gargrave
||    
|-
||    
|align="center"|Herbert Joseph Bruch
|align="center"  |Esquimalt<small>Social Credit
||    
||    
|align="center"  |New Westminster<small>CCF
|align="center"|Rae Eddie
||    
|-
||    
|align="center"|Ray Gillis Williston
|align="center"  |Fort George<small>Social Credit
||    
||    
|align="center" |Vancouver East<small>CCF
|align="center"|Arthur James Turner
||    
|-
||    
|align="center"|Philip Arthur Gaglardi<small>
|align="center"  |Kamloops<small>Social Credit
||    
||    
|align="center"  |Fernie<small>Labour (Party)
|align="center"|Thomas Aubert Uphill
||    
|-
||    
|align="center"|Donald Frederick Robinson
|align="center"  |Lillooet<small>Social Credit
||    
||    
|align="center"  |Oak Bay<small>Liberal
|align="center"|Philip Archibald Gibbs
||    
|-
||    
|align="center"|Earle Cathers Westwood
|align="center"  |Nanaimo and the Islands<small>Social Credit
||    
||    
|align="center"  |Victoria City<small>Liberal
|align="center"|George Frederick Thompson Gregory
||    
|-
||    
|align="center"|Wesley Drewett Black
|align="center"  |Nelson-Creston<small>Social Credit
||    
|-
||    
|align="center"|Lorne Shantz
|align="center"  |North Okanagan<small>Social Credit
||    
|-
||    
|align="center"|Harold Earle Roche
|align="center"  |North Peace River<small>Social Credit
||    
|-
||    
|align="center"|John Melvin Bryan Sr.
|align="center" rowspan=2 |North Vancouver<small>Social Credit
||    
|-
||    
|align="center"|Newton Phillips Steacy
||    
|-
||    
|align="center"|Cyril Morley Shelford
|align="center"  |Omineca<small>Social Credit
||    
|-
||    
|align="center"|William Harvey Murray
|align="center"  |Prince Rupert<small>Social Credit
||    
|-
||    
|align="center"|Arvid Lundell
|align="center"  |Revelstoke<small>Social Credit
||    
|-
||    
|align="center"|Robert Edward Sommers<small>
|align="center"  |Rossland-Trail<small>Social Credit
||    
|-
||    
|align="center"|John Douglas Tidball Tisdalle
|align="center"  |Saanich<small>Social Credit
||    
|-
||    
|align="center"|James Allan Reid<small>
|align="center"  |Salmon Arm<small>Social Credit
||    
|-
||    
|align="center"|Frank Richter, Jr.<small>
|align="center"  |Similkameen<small>Social Credit
||    
|-
||    
|align="center"|Hugh Addison Shirreff
|align="center"  |Skeena<small>Social Credit
||    
|-
||    
|align="center"|William Andrew Cecil Bennett1
|align="center"  |South Okanagan<small>Social Credit
||    
|-
||    
|align="center"|Stanley Carnell
|align="center"  |South Peace River<small>Social Credit
||    
|-
||    
|align="center"|Eric Charles Fitzgerald Martin<small>
|align="center" rowspan=2 |Vancouver-Burrard<small>Social Credit
||    
|-
||    
|align="center"|Herbert Price<small>
||    
|-
||    
|align="center"|Alexander Small Matthew
|align="center" rowspan=2  |Vancouver Centre<small>Social Credit
||    
|-
||    
|align="center"|Leslie Raymond Peterson
||    
|-
||    
|align="center"|Frederick Morton Sharp
|align="center"  |Vancouver East<small>Social Credit
||    
|-
||    
|align="center"|Thomas Audley Bate
|align="center" rowspan=2  |Vancouver-Point Grey<small>Social Credit
||    
|-
||    
|align="center"|Buda Hosmer Brown
||    
|-
||    
|align="center"|William Neelands Chant
|align="center" rowspan=2  |Victoria City<small>Social Credit
||    
|-
||    
|align="center"|John Donald Smith
||    
|-
||    
|align="center"|Irvine Finlay Corbett<small>
|align="center" |Yale<small>Social Credit
||    
|-
|
|align="center"|1 Premier-Elect
|align="center"|2 Leader of the Opposition
|-
|-
| align="center" colspan="10"|Source: Elections BC
|-
|}

See also
List of British Columbia political parties

1956
British Columbia
1956 in British Columbia
September 1956 events in Canada